William Garner Burgin Jr. (August 3, 1924 – October 3, 2002) was an American attorney and politician. He served in the Mississippi State Senate from 1952 to 1960 and from 1964 to 1979, when he was convicted of conspiring to defraud the government.

Biography 
William Garner Burgin Jr. was born on August 3, 1924, in Rock Hill, South Carolina. He graduated from Ole Miss in 1947. In April 1952, Burgin was first elected to the Mississippi State Senate to replace the deceased T. H. Henry. Burgin was re-elected in 1955 and served in the 1956-1960 term. He was re-elected to the Senate in 1964, and was re-elected in 1967, 1971, and 1975.

In 1977 Burgin (D) State Senator and Chair of the Senate Appropriations Committee, was caught in an FBI investigation, for conspiring to defraud the US Government Head Start Program.  He was found guilty and sentenced to fourteen months in prison and fined $10,000.
Burgin was fined $10,000. Burgin died on October 3, 2002.

David Flavous Lambert, Jr. (D) also a State Senator, was charged with conspiring to defraud for taking money meant for Head Start programs.  He was found guilty and sentenced to 24 months in prison and fined $10,000.

References 

1924 births
2002 deaths
Democratic Party Mississippi state senators
Mississippi lawyers
American politicians convicted of fraud
University of Mississippi alumni
People from Rock Hill, South Carolina